The List of watermills is a link page for any watermill.

Historical mills
List of ancient watermills
List of early medieval watermills
Barbegal aqueduct and mill
Hierapolis sawmill

Africa

 Drostdy Museum, Swellendam, South Africa
 Josephine Mill, Cape Town, South Africa

Asia
  Pundri in India

Australasia

Australia

 Dunn's Mill, Bridgewater, South Australia
 Dight's Ceres Mill, Abbotsford, Victoria
 Anderson's Mill, Smeaton, Victoria
 Carome Mill, South Morang, Victoria
 Thomas Mill, Mernda, Victoria
 Janefield Mill, Bundoora, Victoria
 Ben Eadie Mill, Sunbury, Victoria
 Hepburn's Werona Mill, Kingston, Victoria
 Barrabool Flour Mill, Buckley's Falls, Highton, Geelong, Victoria
 Polworth Mill, Rosebrook, Victoria
 Jetty Mills, Warrnambool, Victoria
 Glendining and McKenzie Mill, Riddells Creek, Victoria
 Waterwheel Flourmill, Bridgewater on Loddon, Victoria
 Fyansford Paper Mill, Fyansford, Victoria

Europe

Isle of Man
Laxey Wheel
Little Isabella
Snaefell Wheel

Luxemburg
Lameschmillen

Netherlands
Oliemolen, Heerlen
Weltermolen, Welten

Ireland
Ballincollig Royal Gunpowder Mills
Cregg Mill, County Galway
Newmills Corn and Flax Mills

Switzerland
Hofenmühle

United Kingdom
See List of watermills in the United Kingdom.

North America

Canada
Arva Flour Mill, Arva, Ontario
Balmoral Grist Mill Museum, Nova Scotia
Caledonia Mill,  Caledonia, Ontario
Kings Landing Historical Settlement, New Brunswick
Morningstar Mill, St. Catharines, Ontario
Tyrone Mill, Tyrone, Ontario
Moulin du Petit-Pré, Château-Richer, Quebec 
Watson's Mill, Manotick, Ontario
Wile Carding Mill, Bridgewater, Nova Scotia

United States
See List of watermills in United States

See also
List of windmills
Tide mill
Gristmill

References